Naohisa (written: 直久 or 直寿) is a masculine Japanese given name. Notable people with the name include:

, Japanese photographer
, Japanese painter
, Japanese judoka

Japanese masculine given names